The 2019 Erovnuli Liga or Crystalbet Erovnuli Liga 2019 (formerly known as Umaglesi Liga) was the 31st season of top-tier football in Georgia. Saburtalo Tbilisi were the defending champions. The season began on 1 March 2019 and ended on 1 December 2019.

Teams and stadiums

League table

Results
Each team will play the other nine teams home and away twice, for a total of 36 games each.

First half of season

Second half of season

Relegation play-offs

Season statistics

Top scorers

References

Erovnuli Liga seasons
1
Georgia
Georgia